Area 52 may refer to:

 Tonopah Test Range, a military installation near Tonopah, Nevada
 Dugway Proving Grounds, a military installation in Tooele County, Utah.

Fictional places and areas in movies and television programs
 Area 52, codename for Stargate Command in the Stargate Universe
 Area 52, a secret government facility underneath Area 51 in the movie Zoom
 Area 52, a more secret government facility like Area 51 in the movie Looney Tunes: Back in Action
 Area 52, pyramids in Egypt in the Doctor Who episode "The Wedding of River Song"
 Area 52, the new Nazi headquarters near Roswell, New Mexico in the video game "Wolfenstein II: The New Colossus"
 Area 52, the site just outside of Area 51 and the site of a Challenge "Total Drama World Tour"

Other uses
 Area 52 (album), a 2012 album by Rodrigo y Gabriela and C.U.B.A.
 Brodmann area 52, an area of the brain
 "Area 52", a song from the 2001 video game SimCity 4: Rush Hour
 "Area 52", a 2013 song by Yeah Yeah Yeahs from the album Mosquito
 "Area 52", a song from the 2003 animated movie Looney Tunes: Back in Action

See also
 Area 51 (disambiguation)